Stanley Afedzie (born December 30, 1987, in Accra) is a Ghanaian footballer, who currently plays for R.O.C. de Charleroi-Marchienne.

Career
Afedzie began his career with Liberty Professionals F.C. in September 2005 signed than for Hearts of Oak. He left after three years Hearts of Oak to join on 8 January 2008 to Libyan Premier League club Al-Ittihad Tripoli. After only one and a half year left Afedzie the Libyan club Al-Ittihad Tripoli and turned back to Hearts of Oak on 29 April 2009, just few months later signed for HŠK Zrinjski Mostar, here played his first match on 15 July 2009 against SK Slovan Bratislava at the Champions League Qualifying 2009/2010.

References

External links
Stanley Afedzie on Football-lineups.com.

1987 births
Living people
Footballers from Accra
Ghanaian footballers
Ghanaian expatriate footballers
Association football midfielders
Liberty Professionals F.C. players
Accra Hearts of Oak S.C. players
Al-Ittihad Club (Tripoli) players
Expatriate footballers in Libya
HŠK Zrinjski Mostar players
Expatriate footballers in Bosnia and Herzegovina
R. Olympic Charleroi Châtelet Farciennes players
Expatriate footballers in Belgium
Ghanaian expatriate sportspeople in Libya
Ghanaian expatriate sportspeople in Belgium
Libyan Premier League players